The Mississippi Mills Packing and Shipping Rooms in Wesson, Mississippi were built in 1875.  The complex was listed on the National Register of Historic Places in 1996.  According to the NRHP nomination, the complex "is locally
significant in the area of industry..., representing the importance of the cotton and woolen mills industry to the history and
development of Wesson and the surrounding area."

References

Commercial buildings on the National Register of Historic Places in Mississippi
Italianate architecture in Mississippi
Buildings designated early commercial in the National Register of Historic Places
Commercial buildings completed in 1875
Copiah County, Mississippi
Packing houses
National Register of Historic Places in Copiah County, Mississippi
Cotton mills in the United States